Abel Jacobus 'Tjoppie' de Klerk (born 9 December 1991) is a Namibian rugby union player. He was named in Namibia's squad for the 2015 Rugby World Cup.

References

1991 births
Living people
Namibian rugby union players
White Namibian people
Namibian Afrikaner people
Namibia international rugby union players
Place of birth missing (living people)
Rugby union props
Welwitschias players